Louny District is a district in the Ústí nad Labem Region of the Czech Republic. Its capital is the town of Louny, but the most populated town is Žatec.

Administrative division
Louny District is divided into three administrative districts of municipalities with extended competence: Louny, Podbořany and Žatec.

List of municipalities
Towns are marked in bold and market towns in italics:

Bitozeves -
Blatno -
Blažim -
Blšany -
Blšany u Loun -
Brodec -
Břvany -
Cítoliby -
Čeradice -
Černčice -
Chlumčany -
Chožov -
Chraberce -
Deštnice -
Dobroměřice -
Domoušice -
Holedeč -
Hříškov -
Hřivice -
Jimlín -
Koštice -
Kozly -
Krásný Dvůr -
Kryry -
Lenešice -
Libčeves -
Liběšice -
Libočany -
Libořice -
Lipno -
Lišany -
Líšťany -
Louny -
Lubenec -
Měcholupy -
Nepomyšl -
Nová Ves -
Nové Sedlo -
Obora -
Očihov -
Opočno -
Panenský Týnec -
Peruc -
Petrohrad -
Pnětluky -
Počedělice -
Podbořanský Rohozec -
Podbořany -
Postoloprty -
Raná -
Ročov -
Slavětín -
Smolnice -
Staňkovice -
Toužetín -
Tuchořice -
Úherce -
Velemyšleves -
Veltěže -
Vinařice -
Vrbno nad Lesy -
Vroutek -
Vršovice -
Výškov -
Zálužice -
Žatec -
Zbrašín -
Želkovice -
Žerotín -
Žiželice

Geography

Most of the territory is flat and has an agricultural character, only the south and northeast are hilly. The territory is located in the rain shadow of the Ore Mountains and therefore belongs to the driest regions of the country. The territory extends into five geomorphological mesoregions: Most Basin (north and centre), Rakovník Uplands (southwest), Džbán (south), Lower Eger Table (east) and Central Bohemian Uplands (northeast).

The most important river is the Ohře, which drains almost the entire territory. Its most important tributaries are the Blšanka and Chomutovka. The largest body of water is Lenešický Pond. However, there are only a few bodies of water.

České Středohoří is a protected landscape area that extends into the district.

Demographics

Most populated municipalities

Economy
The largest employers with its headquarters in Louny District and at least 500 employers are:

Žatec and its surroundings is known for its tradition of growing Saaz hops. It is a protected designation of origin.

Transport
The D7 motorway from Prague to Chomutov, including the unfinished section, leads across the district. The D6 motorway from Prague to Karlovy Vary passes through the southern part of the district.

Sights

The most important monuments in the district, protected as national cultural monuments, are:
Church of Saint Nicholas in Louny
Krásný Dvůr Castle

The best-preserved settlements and landscapes, protected as monument reservations and monument zones, are:
Žatec (includes both a monument reservation and a monument zone)
Louny
Soběchleby
Stekník
Žatec hops landscape

The most visited tourist destination is the Krásný Dvůr Castle.

References

External links

Louny District profile on the Czech Statistical Office's website

 
Districts of the Czech Republic